The Gable Creek Formation is a sedimentary rock formation from the Albian age of the Early Cretaceous. The formation is in Wheeler County, Oregon of the United States of America and is intertongued with the similarly aged Hudspeth Formation. The formation mostly consists of fluvial-deltaic sandstones and conglomerates. Marine fossils can be found throughout the formation including various species of ammonites, clams and other mollusks. The Gable Creek Formation gets its name from Gable Creek, a creek that runs through much of the formation.

Fossil content

Other invertebrates

See also 
 Paleontology in Oregon

References

External links 
 
 Sedimentary rocks of Oregon - Hudspeth & Gable Creek Formations

Geologic formations of Oregon
Cretaceous geology of Oregon
Lower Cretaceous Series of North America
Albian Stage
Conglomerate formations
Sandstone formations
Paleontology in Oregon